All That is Heavy (originally All That's Heavy) is an online music store based in Texas and founded in 1997. It is the first online record store dedicated exclusively to the genres of stoner rock, doom metal, sludge metal, drone metal and psychedelic rock. All That is Heavy was originally owned and operated MeteorCity Records, which was instrumental in the growth of the late 1990s stoner rock scene. Distributed labels, besides their formerly in-house MeteorCity Records, include Tee Pee, Volcom Entertainment, Small Stone Records, Rise Above Records, and others. The store was operated by the now defunct StonerRock.com from 2001 to 2010, and was owned by Dan Beland. On 25 August 2017 it was announced that All That Is Heavy would be taken into new ownership by Casey Kelch and relocated to Houston, Texas.

History 
All That's Heavy was founded in September 1997 by Jadd Shickler (of band Spiritu) and Aaron Emmel in Albuquerque, New Mexico. Its first incarnation was an online store selling hard-to-find releases by stoner rock bands Kyuss, Monster Magnet, and Fu Manchu. They soon expanded the catalog to include artists that stylistically fit with the first three bands.

After running the online store for about half a year, they were contacted by the former proprietor for the first Kyuss fan website. He recommended MeteorCity do a compilation of unsigned bands that Kyuss fans would enjoy. MeteorCity Records was formed, and the result of the suggestion was the compilation Welcome to MeteorCity, which was released in May of that year. The compilation included both established desert and stoner rock acts, including new bands established by John Garcia of Kyuss (now in Unida), Ed Mundell of Monster Magnet, and Pete Stahl. The album was the first time that the bands Sixty Watt Shaman, Lowrider, The Atomic Bitchwax, Dozer, Goatsnake, Drag Pack, and Los Natas were heard on a record. The record label and store both increased in popularity after the release. Around this time a MeteorCity intern purportedly coined the term desert rock to describe the burgeoning genre, which is still used interchangeably with the more known descriptor "stoner rock".

Change of ownership
As the scene continued to develop, the popular website StonerRock.com was launched by Dan Beland in 1999. The website became a central community hub for heavy music artists and fans, and frequently featured reviews and interviews with stoner rock musicians. In March 2001, MeteorCity licensed StonerRock.com to take over management and operations of All That's Heavy. All That's Heavy's catalog grew to become the largest online store of stoner rock, doom metal, sludge metal, drone metal and psychedelic rock. MeteorCity in turn began to focus more on the label. All That's Heavy was officially sold to Dan Beland and Melanie Streko of StonerRock.com on May 15, 2004, and renamed All That is Heavy. In 2007, Shickler and Emmel sold MeteorCity Records to Dan Beland and Melanie Streko as well. In 2010 StonerRock.com was taken offline, and MeteorCity Records became the official label for All That is Heavy.
Following personal reasons, Beland became sole owner of All That Is Heavy in 2014 and eventually announced the possibility of selling the site in the summer of 2017. On 25 August 2017 it was announced that All That Is Heavy would be taken into new ownership by Casey Kelch and relocated to Houston, Texas.

References

External links
All That is Heavy
MeteorCity Records

Retail companies established in 1997
Online music stores of the United States
Internet properties established in 1997